This article lists the Secretaries-General of Hezbollah.

List of Secretaries-General of Hezbollah

References

Hezbollah